Guttorm Granum (4 July 1904 – 14 September 1963) was a Norwegian politician for the Conservative Party.

He was born in Vardal.

He was elected to the Norwegian Parliament from the Market towns of Hedmark and Oppland counties in 1950, and was re-elected on two occasions. Midway in his third term, he died and was replaced by Trygve Owren.

Granum was a member of Gjøvik city council in the periods 1945–1947 and 1955–1958. He was a member of the national party board from 1950 to 1954.

Outside politics, he worked as a wholesaler.

References

1904 births
1963 deaths
Conservative Party (Norway) politicians
Members of the Storting
Oppland politicians
Politicians from Gjøvik
20th-century Norwegian politicians